Ysbyty’r tri Chwm is a mental health facility in Ebbw Vale, Blaenau Gwent, Wales. The site was opened in 1996. It is managed by the Aneurin Bevan University Health Board.

History
The hospital was commissioned to replace Pen-y-Fal Hospital in Abergavenny which closed the following year. Ysbyty’r Tri Chwm was officially opened by Glenys Kinnock in July 1996.

The closure of Ebbw Vale Hospital in 2005 led to plans for a new hospital to be built in Ebbw Vale. The site around Ysbyty’r Tri Chwm was originally selected for the new construction. However, councillors later voted for the new Ysbyty Aneurin Bevan to be built on the site of a former steelworks. In 2019, plans were announced to move 15 beds from Ysbyty’r Tri Chwm to Nevill Hall Hospital in Abergavenny when Grange University Hospital in Cwmbran is completed, which is due to be opened in 2021.

Operations
The hospital is located around one mile from Ebbw Vale, near Ebbw Vale College. The site contains two separate day hospitals, Oak Parc and Elm Parc. Between them the two units have 36 mixed gender ward places available for patients over the age of 65 who suffer from mental health issues. A community mental health team is also based at the hospital and provides community based assessments. The hospital is managed the Aneurin Bevan University Health Board.

A wide variety of activities are encouraged at the centre, including painting, exercise, music and gardening: there is a sensory garden onsite. The hospital also contains a dining room and cafe, enclosed garden space and a gym. A sensory garden was also installed in 2005 after work from local school pupils and volunteers.

References

External links
 Ysbyty’r tri Chwm

Hospital buildings completed in 1996
Hospitals in Blaenau Gwent
NHS hospitals in Wales
Buildings and structures in Blaenau Gwent
Aneurin Bevan University Health Board